This is a list of aqueducts in the city of Rome listed in chronological order of their construction.

Ancient Rome

Modern Rome 
 Acqua Vergine Antica
 built in 1453
 source: springs in Salone, east of Rome
 length: ; underground from its source to its terminus at the fountain of Trevi on the Quirinal Hill
 Acqua Felice
 built in 1586
 source: springs at Pantano Borghese, off Via Casilina
 Acqua Paola
 built in 1611
 source: Lake Bracciano, northwest of Rome
 later piped to Vatican Hill
 Acqua Pia Antica Marcia
 built in 1870
 source: springs near Subiaco, east of Rome
 Acqua Vergine Nuova
 built in 1937
 source: springs in Salone, east of Rome
 length: ; underground from its source to its terminus at the fountains in Piazza del Popolo and the fountains on the western slope of the Pincio, overlooking Piazza del Popolo
 Acqua Peschiera
 built in 1949
 source: springs in Sorgenti, northeast of Rome
 length: ; underground from its source, splitting into two branches:
 Peschiera Sinistra, approaching Rome from the east
 Peschiera Destra, taking a westward route, crossing the Tiber River at Poggio Mireto Scalo, about 30 miles north of Rome to its terminus at the fountain of Piazzale degli Eroi (Italian: Heroes' Square), just north of Vatican Hill
 Acqua Appio-Allesandrino
 built in 1965
 source: catchment basins along the volcano Angela at Pantano Borghese, Finocchi, Torre Angela

See also 
 Roman aqueduct
 List of aqueducts
 Parco degli Acquedotti
 Ancient Roman technology
 Roman engineering
 Frontinus

References

Sources

External links 
 Famous Fountains of Rome
 Famous Squares and Fountains of Rome
 Models of Various Aqueducts of Ancient Rome
 Routes of Various Aqueducts of Ancient Rome
 The Fountains of Rome (by Region)

 
Aqueducts
Aqueducts, Roman, by date